The Federal Power Commission (FPC) was an independent commission of the United States government, originally organized on June 23, 1930, with five members nominated by the president and confirmed by the Senate. The FPC was originally created in 1920 by the Federal Water Power Act, which provided for the licensing by the FPC of hydroelectric projects on the land or navigable water owned by the federal government. The FPC has since been replaced by the Federal Energy Regulatory Commission.

The FPC also regulated interstate electric utilities and the natural gas industry.

In June 1939, President Roosevelt appointed Leland Olds to the FPC, who served as chairman from January 1940 until 1949. Under Olds’ leadership, the FPC successfully pressured electric utilities to extend power into neglected rural areas and to lower electricity rates to increase use.

Olds' insistence on enforcing the Natural Gas Act of 1938 raised the ire of the oil industry in Texas and led to the end of his tenure at the FPC. Robert Caro's book Master of the Senate describes how Lyndon B. Johnson defeated Olds' re-appointment by orchestrating a smear campaign. The tactics involved having the staff of the House Un-American Activities Committee dig up old writings, which were then taken out of context to create a false image of Olds as a communist. The subcommittee in charge of reappointment was stacked against Leland and coached by Johnson.

James G. Watt was another prominent FPC commissioner, who conducted prayer meetings prior to the FPC sessions.

Chairmen 
From its founding in 1920 until its first reform in 1930, the FPC did not have its own commissioners; rather, it was chaired ex officio by the Secretaries of War, Interior, and Agriculture. The first "Chairman" in that sense was Woodrow Wilson's Secretary of War, Newton D. Baker. Before 1930, five Secretaries of War, five Secretaries of the Interior, and five Secretaries of Agriculture held title at the FPC.

Following the 1930 reforms, FPC had its own commissioners, with the following commissioners holding the title of Chairman of the Federal 
Power Commission:

Past Chairmen
George Otis Smith 	December 22, 1930 - July 18, 1933
Frank R. McNinch July 19, 1933 - September 30, 1937
Clyde L. Seavey September 30, 1937 - December 31, 1939
Leland Olds January 1, 1940 - June 22, 1944
Basil Manly September 21, 1944 - September 14, 1945
Leland Olds December 14, 1945 - January 1, 1947
Nelson Lee Smith January 1, 1947 - May 24, 1950
Mon C. Wallgren May 24, 1950 - October 1, 1951
Thomas C. Buchanan January 5, 1952 - May 15, 1953
Jerome K. Kuykendall May 15, 1953 - August 31, 1961
Joseph C. Swidler September 1, 1961 - December 30, 1965
Lee C. White March 2, 1966 - July 31, 1969
John N. Nassikas August 1, 1969  - June 22, 1975
Richard L. Dunham October 20, 1975 -  August 9, 1977
Charles B. Curtis August 10, 1977 - September 30, 1977 (through renaming to FERC)

Past Commissioners
James G. Watt November 11, 1975 - August 30, 1977
Richard L. Dunham October 20, 1975 - August 9, 1977
John H. Holloman September 3, 1975 - August 4, 1977
Don S. Smith December 13, 1973 - June 30, 1979 
William L. Springer June 14, 1973 - December 1, 1975
Rush Moody Jr. November 19, 1971 - March 15, 1975
Pinkney Walker May 26, 1971 - December 31, 1972
John N. Nassikas August 1, 1969 - October 20, 1975
Albert Buch Brooke Jr. October 16, 1968 - March 31, 1975
John A. Carver Jr. September 13, 1966 - June 15, 1972
Lee C. White March 2, 1966 - July 31, 1969
Carl E. Bagge May 27, 1965 - December 31, 1970
David S. Black August 30, 1963 - September 13, 1966
Harold C. Woodward March 30, 1962 - August 4, 1964
Charles R. Ross September 29, 1961 - September 25, 1968
Lawrence J. O’Connor Jr. August 14, 1961 - August 30, 1971
Joseph C. Swidler June 28, 1961 - December 30, 1965
Howard Morgan June 28, 1961 - June 22, 1963
Paul A. Sweeney July 15, 1960 - April 15, 1961
John B. Hussey June 23, 1958 - March 17, 1960
Arthur Kline June 23, 1956 - August 13, 1961
Wiliam R. Connole June 23, 1955 - June 22, 1958
Fredrick Stueck July 9, 1954 - July 15, 1961
Seaborn L. Digby August 17, 1953 - June 22, 1958
Jerome K. Kuykendall May 15, 1953 - August 31, 1961
Dale E. Doty May 22, 1952 - June 22, 1954
Mon C. Wallgren November 2, 1949 - October 1, 1951
Thomas C. Buchanan June 14, 1948 - May 15, 1953
Richard Sachse November 1, 1945 - June 22, 1947
Harrington Wimberly October 5, 1945 - June 22, 1958
Nelson Lee Smith October 26, 1943 - June 22, 1956
Leland Olds July 7, 1939 - June 22, 1944
John W. Scott June 24, 1937 - June 15, 1945
Clyde L. Seavey August 13, 1934 - August 5, 1943
Basil Manly June 24, 1933 - October 1, 1945
Herbert J. Drane June 16, 1933 - June 22, 1937
Ralph B. Williamson December 31, 1930 - December 10, 1932
Frank R. McNinch December 27, 1930 - June 22, 1934
George Otis Smith December 22, 1930 - October 31, 1933
Claude L. Draper December 22, 1930 - June 22, 1956
Marcell Garsaud December 22, 1930 - June 22, 1932

Relevant laws 
46 Stat. 797
41 Stat. 1063
16 United States Code 791-823, the Federal Water Power Act

Dissolution 

On October 1, 1977, the FPC was replaced by the Federal Energy Regulatory Commission.

See also 
 Scenic Hudson Preservation Conference v. Federal Power Commission

References 

 
Organizations established in 1920
Organizations disestablished in 1972